Binz is a seaside resort on the German island of Rügen

Binz may also refer to:

 Binz (vehicles), a German coachbuilder and custom vehicle manufacturer
 Binz (song), a 2019 song by Solange
 BINZ (zoo), Nature Zoo on Belle Isle
 MV Binz, Kriegsmarine tanker